Swathi Sangeethotsavam (Swathi Music Festival) is a ten-day festival of music celebrating the compositions of Maharaja Swathi Thirunal. The festival is held from 4 to 13 January every year at Kuthira Malika, Trivandrum, where the Maharaja is believed to have composed many of his works. The festival is a tribute to Swathi Tirunal and is exclusively dedicated to his compositions. The concerts are not ticketed. The festival is conducted by Rama Varma Maharaja of Travancore Trust under the helm of Prince Rama Varma.

History 
The Government of Kerala used to conduct the festival in Kuthiramalika in memory of Swathi Thirunal. In the late 90s, after they decided to hold it in different places all over Kerala and discontinued the festival at Kuthiramalika,  Rama Varma Maharaja took the initiative to continue the annual festival under the Travancore Trust. The festival is organized by Prince Rama Varma, Carnatic musician and direct descendant of Swathi Tirunal.

List of events

See also

List of Indian classical music festivals
 Chembai Sangeetholsavam
 Kuthira Malika
 Swathi Sangeetha Puraskaram

References

External links

Music festivals established in 2000
Classical music festivals in India
Carnatic classical music festivals
Carnatic music
Music festivals in India
Year of establishment missing
Annual events in India
Hindu music festivals